Masonetta is a monotypic genus of North American dwarf spiders containing the single species, Masonetta floridana. It was first described by Ralph Vary Chamberlin & Vaine Wilton Ivie in 1939, and has only been found in the United States.

See also
 List of Linyphiidae species (I–P)

References

Linyphiidae
Monotypic Araneomorphae genera
Spiders of the United States